The banded supple skink (Lygosoma haroldyoungi), also known as Harold's writhing skink or Harold Young's supple skink, is a species of skink in the family Scincidae. The species is endemic to Southeast Asia.

Etymology
The specific name, haroldyoungi, is in honor of American missionary Harold Young, who worked in Burma (now Myanmar) and Thailand.

Distribution and habitat
L. haroldyoungi is distributed in northern, central, and eastern Thailand and neighbouring Laos (Moravec and Böhme 2008). In Thailand it has been found in the provinces of Chachoengsao, Chaiyaphum, Chanthaburi, Chiang Mai, Chiang Rai, Nong Khai, Phetchabun, Phitsanulok, Nakhon Ratchasima, and Loei. In Laos it occurs in Vientiane Province, and it is also found in Myanmar.

L. haroldyoungi is found in tropical deciduous forest and cultivated areas.

Conservation status
L. haroldyoungi is threatened by habitat loss, but this is not a significant threat as it survives in agricultural areas.

References

Further reading
Geissler P, Hartmann T, Neang T (2012). "A new species of the genus Lygosoma Hardwicke & Gray, 1827 (Squamata: Scincidae) from northeastern Cambodia, with an updated identification key to the genus Lygosoma in mainland Southeast Asia". Zootaxa 3190: 56–68.
Moravec J, Böhme W (2008). "First record of Riopa haroldyoungi from Laos". Herpetological Notes 1: 9–10.
Taylor EH (1962). "New Oriental Reptiles". Univ. Kansas Sci. Bull. 43 (7): 209–263. (Riopa haroldyoungi, new species, pp. 242–244, Figure 12).

Lygosoma
Reptiles described in 1962
Taxa named by Edward Harrison Taylor
Taxonomy articles created by Polbot